RPM Mortgage is an independently owned and operated mortgage lender and broker based in Alamo, California. The company’s roots in the Bay Area stem back to 1986. RPM Mortgage is owned by Rob and Tracey Hirt.  The company has over 70 branches in Arizona, California, Colorado, Nevada, Oregon, and Washington with over 800 loan agents and employees. 

RPM Mortgage is a retail only lender and a direct seller and servicer of Fannie Mae loans. In 2010 RPM closed over $4.55 billion in originations with $1.3 billion of the originations being service-retained. In 2013, the company provided $5.9 billion in funding in the form of residential mortgages.

RPM offers various loan programs such as Conventional Purchases, Refinances, CalSTRS, Fannie Mae DU Refi Plus, Fannie Mae Home Path, Streamline Refinances, and Jumbo loans. RPM is a direct lender with full-eagle approval from the department of Housing and Urban Development (HUD) with the following lenders: Fannie Mae, GMAC, Chase, Bank of America and US Bank. RPM is an Equal Opportunity Lender

Ratings and reviews
It is accredited by BBB.

History
The company has been rooted in the Bay Area since 1986. In 1991, Rob and Tracey Hirt invested in a small, start-up mortgage company– Residential Pacific Mortgage. In 1996, Rob was awarded the ownership rights to re-acquire Residential Pacific Mortgage, which eventually became RPM Mortgage. Rob has led RPM to become one of the top 15 private, retail mortgage lenders in the U.S. according to the Scotsman Guide 2015 rankings. Since its first evaluation from Standard & Poor's in 2012, RPM remains the only privately owned U.S residential mortgage originator to consistently receive above average ratings across all eight key areas S&P analyzes.

References

External links
 RPM Mortgage, Inc.

Banks based in California
Companies based in Contra Costa County, California
Mortgage lenders of the United States